Palintropus is a prehistoric bird genus from the Late Cretaceous. A single species has been named (Palintropus retusus) based on a proximal coracoid from the Lance Formation of Wyoming, dated to the latest Maastrichtian,  million years ago. Coracoids and a proximal scapula of two unnamed species from the upper Campanian Dinosaur Park Formation of Alberta, dating to between 76.5 and 75 million years ago, are also known.

Initially it was placed in the wastebin genus "Cimolopteryx". Pierce Brodkorb assigned it its current name, first affiliating it with Apatornis in 1963, and establishing its current genus in 1970.

Its relationships are not well determined, mainly due to the paucity of material. Several major theories have been established: Like many of the birds of the subtropical coastlands of the Western Interior Seaway - maybe a bit like eastern Australia today - it is sometimes believed to be an early member of the Charadriiformes (waders, gulls, auks, etc.; see also "Graculavidae"). However, an alternate theory is that it is a galliform, perhaps a quercymegapodiid.

In 2009, Longrich and colleagues proposed that Palintropus is a primitive bird related to Apsaravis. They conducted the first cladistic analysis of the remains, and found this to be the most likely hypothesis, suggesting Palintropus warrants inclusion in the newly established Palintropiformes.

Footnotes

References
  (1970): The generic position of a Cretaceous bird. Quarterly Journal of the Florida Academy of Science. 32(3), 239–240.
  (2002): The Mesozoic radiation of Neornithes. in Chiappe and Witmer, eds. Mesozoic Birds: Above the Heads of Dinosaurs. 339–388.

Bird genera
Prehistoric euornitheans
Late Cretaceous birds of North America